This list comprises all players who have participated in at least one league match for Real Maryland F.C. since the team's first season in USL in 2008. Players who were on the roster but never played a first team game are not listed; players who appeared for the team in other competitions (US Open Cup, CONCACAF Champions League, etc.) but never actually made an USL appearance are noted at the bottom of the page where appropriate.

A "†" denotes players who only appeared in a single match.

A
  Dennis Alas
  Daniel Ankrah
  Oscar Araujo
  Julio Arjona

B
  Nate Baker
  Devlin Barnes
  Stephen Basso
  Jose Bibiano
  Philippe Bissohong
  John Borrajo
  Bill Brindley
  Gary Brooks
  Scott Bukoski
  David Bulow
  Dustin Butcher

C
  Jeff Carroll
  Pat Carroll
  Loanny Cartaya
  Ronald Cerritos
  Marcos Chantel
  Cameron Chastain
  Sean Coleman
  Ryan Cordeiro
  Wilson Correa †

D
  Dangelo Da Silva
  Josh Danza
  Jamie Darvill
  Hamed Diallo
  Yendry Diaz
  Tuan Doan
  Mateus Dos Anjos
  Eric Drewenskus
  Rod Dyachenko

E
  Matthew Eby
  Gareth Evans

F
  Daryl Ferguson
  George Fochive
  Giuseppe Funicello
  Matías Franco

G
  Tony Gass
  Michael Ghebru
  Pablo Hernan Gomez
  Lucio Gonzaga
  Ryan Gracia
  Marc Hérold Gracien

H
  Muner Hassen
  Hunter Hayes
  Ian Hendrie
  Alex Herrera
  Dave Hertel
  Angel Higueras
  Jamie Holmes
  Michael Holody
  Justin Hughes
  Dia Hunte
  Ben Hunter

J
  Shane Johnson

K
  Foday Kamara
  Dave Kern
  Paul Killian
  Kevin King
  Andrew Kish

L
  Alex Lee
  Justin Lee
  Brian Levey
  Axel Levry
  Cecil Lewis
  Fabien Lewis
  Garry Lewis
  Andy Lorei
  Clinton Loughner

M
  Jose Maldonado
  Alfonso Martinez
  Rey Ángel Martínez
  Cristian Montero

N
  Aboubacarim Ndaw
  Jyler Noviello

P
  Jake Pace
  Joseph Pena
  Nilson Perez
  Mike Pertz
  Travis Pittman
  David Purser

R
  Teodoro Ramirez
  Víctor Ramírez
  John Raus
  Howard Rivers
  Sean Rush
  Thomas Ryan

S
  Sergio Salas
  Chris Saul
  Phil Saunders †
  Ross Schunk †
  Joel Senior
  Israel Sesay
  Wesley Sever
  Jesse Sokolow
  James Stevens
  Andy Streilein
  Will Swaim
  Patrick Sweeney
  Nick Sylvester †

T
  Tom Taylor
  Val Teixeira
  Ashleigh Townsend
  Stephen Tupy

U
  Ricardo Unda

V
  Brian Visser

W
  Draymond Washington
  Matt Williams

Z
  Thomas Zimmerman

Sources

2011 Real Maryland Monarchs stats
2010 Real Maryland Monarchs stats
2009 Real Maryland Monarchs stats
2008 Real Maryland Monarchs stats

References

Real Maryland Monarchs
 
Association football player non-biographical articles